Claremont station is a train station in Claremont, New Hampshire served by Amtrak, the U.S. national railroad passenger system. The station was originally opened in 1920 by the Boston and Maine Railroad as Claremont Junction. It not only has parking for bicycles, but actually doubles as a bicycle sales and repair shop called The Wheel House. Claremont is the only Amtrak station in western New Hampshire and is presently served by Amtrak's daily Vermonter service.

References

External links

Claremont Cycle Depot

Amtrak stations in New Hampshire
Buildings and structures in Claremont, New Hampshire
Claremont Junction
Railway stations in the United States opened in 1920
Transportation buildings and structures in Sullivan County, New Hampshire